Northgate or North Gate  may refer to:

Historical structures
 Northgate, Chester, part of the city wall, in Cheshire, England
 St Michael at the North Gate, a church in Oxford, England

Places
 Northgate, Gauteng, South Africa

Australia
 Northgate, Queensland, a suburb in the City of Brisbane
 Northgate, South Australia

Canada
 Northgate, Saskatchewan

England
 Northgate, Lincolnshire, see List of United Kingdom locations: Ni-North G#Northa - North G
 Northgate, Somerset, see List of United Kingdom locations: Ni-North G#Northa - North G
 Northgate, West Sussex

United States
 Northgate, Oakland, California, Contra Costa County
 North Gate, California
 Northgate, Colorado, see List of populated places in Colorado-02#N
 Northgate, Illinois, in Tuscola Township
 North Gate, Indiana
 Northgate, North Dakota
 Northgate, Ohio
 Northgate, Salem, Oregon
 Northgate, Texas
 Northgate, Seattle, Washington

Stations
 Northgate railway station, Brisbane, Queensland, Australia
 Northgate station (Sound Transit), Seattle, Washington, United States
 Chester Northgate railway station, Cheshire, England
 Newark North Gate railway station, Newark-on-Trent, Nottinghamshire, England
 Northgate Transit Centre, Edmonton, Alberta, Canada

Schools
 Northgate High School (disambiguation)
 Northgate Junior – Senior High School, Bellevue, Pennsylvania, United States
 Northgate School District, Pittsburgh, Pennsylvania, United States

Businesses
 Northgate (company), based in Darlington, England
 Northgate Computers (now defunct), based in Minnesota, United States
 Northgate Cyberzone, a business district and financial enclave in Muntinlupa City, Philippines
 Northgate Information Solutions, based in Hemel Hempstead, England
 Northgate Market, Mexican grocery store chain based in California, United States

Malls and shopping centres

Australia
 Northgate Shopping Centre, Glenorchy, Tasmania

Canada
 Northgate Centre, Edmonton, Alberta

South Africa 
 Northgate Shopping Centre, Johannesburg

United States
 Northgate Mall (Durham), North Carolina
 Northgate Mall (Hixson), Tennessee
 Northgate Mall (Ohio), Cincinnati
 Northgate Mall (San Rafael), California
 Northgate Station (shopping mall), formerly Northgate Mall, Seattle, Washington